Otterville is a small unincorporated community in Buchanan County, Iowa, United States, northwest of Independence.

History
 Although the community was founded in the 19th century, the townsfolk never incorporated the community. Otterville remains a small community halfway between Independence and Littleton. Otterville's population was 94 in 1902, and 100 in 1925.

See also

Wapsipinicon River

References

Unincorporated communities in Iowa
Unincorporated communities in Buchanan County, Iowa